The Dark Pictures Anthology is an anthology series of interactive drama and survival horror video games developed by Supermassive Games and published by Bandai Namco Entertainment. The anthology is to consist of eight games, with each game inspired by a different horror genre. Each game features five main characters whose survival depends on the choices made by the player. While each character only appears in one game, face models are often reused in other games, except those of the leading actors. The games use a third-person perspective and the ability to choose from various dialogue options.

The series premiered with Man of Medan in 2019, which is followed by Little Hope (2020), House of Ashes (2021), The Devil in Me (2022), and the upcoming Directive 8020. A spin-off video game, The Dark Pictures: Switchback VR, was released by Supermassive Games for the PlayStation VR2 on 16 March 2023.

Games 

The series is planned to consist of eight games, of which four have been released; Man of Medan (2019), Little Hope (2020), House of Ashes (2021), and the season one finale, The Devil in Me (2022). The initial plan was for a game to release every six months. A spin-off game title Switchback VR (2023) was released for PlayStation VR2. The upcoming Directive 8020 is set to be the season two premiere.

Season One (2019–2022) 

Man of Medan was revealed on 21 August 2018 and released worldwide for PlayStation 4, Windows, and Xbox One on 30 August 2019. A free upgrade was released for PlayStation 5 and Xbox Series X/S on 27 September 2022. The upgrade included a new chapter, as well as enhanced visuals, improved U.I., new difficulty and QTE settings, and other tweaks and features. The game is inspired by the myth of the Ourang Medan, a suspected ghost ship from the 1940s, that wrecked after the crew all died under suspicious circumstances. During World War II, a storm causes a biochemical weapon onboard the SS Ourang Medan called Manchurian Gold to leak from crates. The gas causes the crew to see ghostly figures, causing all of the crew to die either from heart attacks or accidentally being attacked by their fellow crewmates. In the present day, Alex and his brother Brad, as well as Alex's girlfriend, Julia and her brother, Conrad, and their dive boat captain, Fliss are boarded by pirates. They eventually board the Ourang Medan, thinking that the Manchurian Gold is actually gold, although who boards the ghost ship and when depends on player choices. For the rest of the story, choices by the player determines who lives and dies, and if anyone is able to escape the ship after being exposed to the Manchurian Gold.

Little Hope was revealed as a post-credits trailer at the end of Man of Medan and released worldwide for PlayStation 4, Windows, and Xbox One on 30 October 2020. A free upgrade for PlayStation 5 and Xbox Series X/S was released on 27 September 2022. The upgrade included enhanced visuals, improved U.I., new difficulty and QTE settings, amongst other tweaks and features. The game is inspired by the Salem witch trials of 1692, but also takes inspiration from a variety of films and games. Film inspirations include The Blair Witch Project (1999) and The Omen (1976), while the Silent Hill franchise is key video game inspiration.

House of Ashes was first revealed in a post-credits teaser trailer at the end of Little Hope and released worldwide for PlayStation 4, PlayStation 5, Windows, Xbox One, and Xbox Series X/S on 22 October 2021. The game is inspired the films Aliens (1986), Predator (1987), and The Descent (2005); the book At the Mountains of Madness; and the myth of the Curse of Akkad.

The Devil in Me was revealed in a post-credits teaser trailer at the end of House of Ashes and released worldwide for PlayStation 4, PlayStation 5, Windows, Xbox One, and Xbox Series X/S on 18 November 2022 as the season one finale of the anthology. The game is inspired by H. H. Holmes, America's first serial killer, and his "Murder Castle".

Season Two (TBA) 
The Dark Pictures Anthology: Directive 8020 was revealed in a post-credits teaser trailer at the end of The Devil in Me. It will be the season two premiere of the anthology.

Spin-off 
Switchback VR was announced on 2 November 2022 and was referred to as PlayStation VR2 launch window title. However, in January 2023 Supermassive Games announced that the game would be slightly delayed leading to it being released on 16 March 2023 on PlayStation VR2. It is a spiritual successor to Until Dawn: Rush of Blood.

Cast and characters 
<div class="overflowbugx" style="overflow:auto; width:100%;">

Common elements 
The games in the series are horror-themed (with different genres of horror on each installment), and have players making decisions for their characters and watching their consequences play out. As discussed in Until Dawn, these games rely heavily on the butterfly effect, and every decision the player makes can affect the ending the player can achieve. The games have support for co-operative multiplayer play, where each player controls one character.

All games are linked through The Curator, a character voiced by Pip Torrens and modelled on Tony Pankhurst who is present in each installment to introduce each individual story and occasionally converses with the player in his mysterious and strange place called The Repository. The Curator is a continuation of Supermassive Games' tradition of having "narrators" who appear in brief intermissions to give hints or cryptic clues, starting with Dr Hill the psychiatrist in Until Dawn and also later continuing with Eliza the fortune teller in The Quarry.

Art design 
The series' main logo and all the games contain a skull prominently featured in their cover art. For the games, the skull contains teases for what is in the game, while also featuring the leading actor's character. Man of Medan skull features a compass dial around the upper edge. Inside the skull features Conrad with the Ourang Medan in a greenish colorway next to him. Behind the skull is a map. Little Hope features Andrew in the foreground, with Mary near a fire and a hanging stick figure. Behind the skull is a burned map. House of Ashes features a skull with fangs as well as Rachel and a statue of Pazuzu. Behind the skull is a sandstone wall with various images including part of a map. The Devil in Me skull has a piece of metal attached to the mouth with blood. Kate is featured, along with Du'Met and the World's Fair Hotel replica. A map of the area is featured in the background.

Development 
The series is developed by Supermassive Games. In 2020, publisher Bandai Namco Entertainment described it as difficult to market as a series, as it was called an "anthology" while only having one entry; they considered it a long-term investment, that they thought would make more sense to players and would get a larger audience as more games become available.

Music 
The opening theme is a rendition of Conversations with Death, which was recorded in 2017 by American metal bands Khemmis and Spirit Adrift.

Reception 

During its debut week, Man of Medan was the third best-selling physical game in the UK, and the best-selling in Europe, the Middle East, Africa, and Asia and reached one million copies sold worldwide after a year on sale. Little Hope physical sales for its first week in the UK were 47% lower than Man of Medan; GamesIndustry.biz commented that this may in part be due to the COVID-19 pandemic, which led to a larger number of players buying digital versions of video games than in previous years.

Future 
In February 2022, Supermassive Games filed trademarks for six potential future entries. Five featured the standard The Dark Pictures branding, subtitled The Craven Man, Directive 8020, Intercession, Winterfold, and Switchback. The sixth potential title, subtitled O Death, is instead branded The Dark Pictures Presents. Of these potential titles, so far Switchback VR and Directive 8020 have been officially announced.

Notes

References

External links 

Bandai Namco franchises
2010s horror video games
2020s horror video games
Interactive movie video games
Supermassive Games
Unreal Engine games
Video game franchises
Video game franchises introduced in 2019